La Ciénaga is a town in the Barahona province of the Dominican Republic.

Sources 
 – World-Gazetteer.com
  

Municipalities of the Dominican Republic
Populated places in Barahona Province